The superficial parotid lymph nodes are a group of lymph nodes anterior to the ear.

Their afferent vessels drain the root of the nose, the eyelids, the frontotemporal region, the external acoustic meatus and the tympanic cavity, possibly also the posterior parts of the palate and the floor of the nasal cavity.

The efferents of these glands pass to the superior deep cervical glands.

References 

Lymphatics of the head and neck